Southern Football League is an association football league in England.

Southern Football League may also refer to:
Southern Football League (1963-1965), a minor professional American football league in which Huntsville Rockets played
Southern Football League (Scotland), Scottish war time league
Southern Football League (South Australia), an Australian rules football league in South Australia, Australia
Southern Football League (Tasmania), an amateur Australian rules football league in Tasmania, Australia
Southern Football Netball League, an amateur Australian rules football league in Victoria, Australia

See also
Great Southern Football League (disambiguation)